Taylor Foran (born 14 October 2003) is an English professional footballer who plays for League Two side Hartlepool United, on loan from Arsenal, as a defender.

Career
Born in Hillingdon, Foran joined Arsenal in May 2012 and turned professional in July 2022. He was captain of the Arsenal under-18 team, and spent time training with the Arsenal first-team.

Foran moved on loan to League Two side Hartlepool United in January 2023 until the end of the season.

Career statistics

References

2003 births
Living people
English footballers
Footballers from Hillingdon
Arsenal F.C. players
Hartlepool United F.C. players
English Football League players
Association football defenders